Missa Johnouchi (城之内 ミサ; Jōnouchi Misa) (born 1960) is a composer, pianist, conductor and singer who creates Asian-styled new-age music. . Missa Johnouchi was named UNESCO Artist for Peace in August 2006.

Personality

Profile 
Musician, UNESCO Artist for Peace, Ambassadress of the musical relations for the events commemorative of the 1300th anniversary of the Capital of Nara Heijo-Kyo.

While being registered at the Academic institute of music of Toho,  the theory of musical composition section, she began to compose in the  audio-visual area for successful television series, commercials s and the cinema. She studied in France under the direction of the composer Jean-Claude Petit.

Since 1988, Missa Johnouchi is accompanied by the Orchestre National de l’Opéra de Paris and the Orchestre National de Paris for the making of her albums. In 1993, she participated t in the international conductors contest of Besançon.
Her album of Asian original compositions, “Healing music”, was one of the best selling  albums in the occidental countries.
Among her several  performances  and the first time ever, she gave a concert based on her  own compositions, as a pianist and as a conductor, in the department of Nara, in front of Kofukuji and Higashikondo (indicated like national treasures). 
Missa Johnouchi wrote composed and played the music in the opening ceremony of  the Flower Festival of Hamanakako, entitled “New elegances of the flowers”, whose production was ensured by a great Master of Japanese poetry, Mannnojo Nomura.

At the “World Heritage Torch-Run Concert – Missa Johnouchi”, organized upon the initiative of several countries around  the world, the artist plays  her own musical compositions on the piano  and directs the national orchestras of these countries. She performed in America, China, Tunisia, Italy, Australia, Venezuela, Peru, Canada, Macedonia, Romania and  France for commemorative events. 
At the Carnegie Hall in  New York, 200 families of the victims of the terrorist attack of  11 September  were invited to the concert organized for the wish to obtain   peace. 
She also performed  for the 30th birthday of the Japanese and Australian relations at the Opera house in Sidney, part of  UNESCOe list of the world heritage.

In 2006, for the first time, a Japanese female  composer and conductor was appointed e UNESCO Artist for Peace.
In May 2007, at the “World Heritage Torch-Run Concert for the 35th anniversary of the convention on  the protection of the world heritage” in the church of Saint-Germain-des-Prés in Paris, Missa Johnouchi played her own music, and e directed  the Orchestre National de l’Opéra de Paris that accompanied her.

Moreover, she composed the music that accompanied  the images of the exhibition  at the Petit Palais of Paris, entitled “Shôkokuji, Gold Pavilion, Silver Pavilion, Zen and Art with Kyoto within the celebration of the 150th birthday of the Japanese and French  relations and the 50th birthday of the Paris and Kyoto twin cities”.

In October 2009, the album « Spiritual Discovery » is released, for the first time in cooperation with UNESCO.
 
Still today, she continues,  in her own country and  abroad, her function as a  UNESCO messenger, as could be seen during  the exceptional concert that took place at  UNESCO’s Headquarters on 12 November 2009 in Paris or in Tokyo in  November 2010 where she gave a charity concert for the children of Afghanistan. She was the first Japanese female  “UNESCO Artist for Peace (in charge of the world heritage)” in the section musical composition and conduction, to continue to transmit the message on “ Peace of the heart”, “ conservation of the world heritage”, “ environmental protection”, “ education”.

Discography

Asian Blossoms (13 Jun 2000)
 1. Asian Wind
 2. Seasons
 3. Marco Polo
 4. Song Of Silk Road
 5. Blossom
 6. Springtime
 7. Night Bird
 8. Butterfly
 9. Twilight
 10. Once Upon A Time
 11. Asian Wind – (Piano Version)

Friends (19 August 2000)
 1. Pastoral
 2. Espoir
 3. In Paradisum
 4. Tristesse
 5. Tomorrow
 6. Solitude
 7. Forest
 8. Walking On Air
 9. Mirage
 10. Aprés Midi
 11. Glowing Sky
 12. Spoons Dance
 13. Tristesse (Reprise)

Yamatoji Symphony : The Eternal Yamato (2002)
 1. Birth [Tanjou]
 2. Prayers
 3. Vicissitudes [Eikoseisui]
 4. The Wings Of Spacetime [Jikuu no Tsubasa]

road to OASIS (12 February 2002)
 1. The Last Caravan
 2. Shangri-La
 3. road to OASIS
 4. Desert Mirage
 5. Moon Over The Border
 6. Snow Bird
 7. Stardust Tapestry
 8. Nomads
 9. Holy Sunset
 10. Prayer
 11. Horizon

Dimanche (21 September 2002)
 1. Hoshi no Kioku [Memories Of Stars]
 2. Maioriru Tenshi [Flying Down Angel]
 3. Akanegumo [Rosy Clouds]
 4. Mayonaka no Mail [Midnight Mail]
 5. Chikyuugi [Globe]
 6. My Friend (to Vivian)
 7. Screen Music ni Koishi te [Loving Screen Music]
 8. Koi no Atokataduke [After Love]
 9. Ieji [The Way Home]
 10. Umibe no Gogo [Afternoon At Seaside]
 11. Je n'aime pas moi

Kurenai (28 September 2002)
 1. Legend Of The Mountain
 2. Dream Land
 3. Kurenai
 4. Pilgrimage
 5. Sea Wind
 6. Déjà Vu ~Light in the Void
 7. Full Moon Bay
 8. Shanghai Twilight
 9. Desert Walk
 10. Lawrence
 11. Silky Sky
 12. End Of The Silk Road

Kataribe ~Piano Collection (26 Jun 2003)
 1. Kataribe (Story Teller)
 2. Miyako (Ancient City)
 3. Streets Of Kyoto
 4. Asian Wind – (piano version)
 5. Funauta (A Boatman's Song)
 6. Shigure (A Scattered Shower)
 7. Shuufu (Antumn Breeze)
 8. Springtime
 9. Snow Forest
 10. Hatsuyuki (First Snow)
 11. Déjà Vu ~Light in the Void
 12. Sekka (Snow Blossoms)
 13. Horizon
 14. Snow Dance

Kuge (29 October 2003)
DISC 1
 1. Skyward
 2. Stardust Island
 3. Lake
 4. Kazamatsuri
 5. Kataribe
 6. Exotica
 7. Prayer (Suite "Yamatoji Symphony : The Eternal Yamato" #2)
 8. Kotohime
 9. Sunset Moon
DISC 2 (Symphony)
 1. Kuge II
 2. Eurasia

Canon ~Missa Johnouchi Best (29 September 2004)
 1. Asian Wind
 2. Stardust Tapestry
 3. Kataribe
 4. Seasons
 5. Moon Beach
 6. Marco Polo
 7. Desert Mirage
 8. Pilgrimage
 9. Shangri-La
 10. Shanghai Twilight
 11. Night Bird
 12. Kirisamekodo (Ancient Roads in the Mist)

3 Nen B Gumi Kinpachi Sensei (OST) (19 January 2005)

Evening (22 Jun 2005)
 1. Evening
 2. Marco Polo (Remix)
 3. Lake (Remix)
 4. A Song Of The Lilies (Piano & Strings)
 5. Asian Wind (Remix)
 6. road to OASIS (Remix)
 7. Il Pleure dans mon cœur (Piano & Strings)
 8. Evening (Piano Version)

Snow ~Piano Collection (18 July 2006)
 3. Snow Forest
 6. Shigure (A Scattered Shower)
 9. Sekka (Snow Blossoms)
 10. Hatsuyuki (First Snow)

Fufudo (OST) 30 May 2007

Le Chant de La Terre (11 October 2007)
 1. Le Chant de La Terre
 2. Kaze no Hohoemi [Wind's Smile]
 3. Ilumine
 4. Harukana Tabi no Naka de [In Distant Travels]
 5. Snow Bird (Violin & Piano Version)
 6. Taiyou no Michi [The Road of the Sun]
 7. Le Muguet
 8. Tsumetai Tsuki no Hikari wo Abite [A Cold Moonlight Shower]
 9. Souseki [Genesis]
 10. Genka
 11. Kono Te wo Kazashite [Put Up Your Hands]
 12. Avec Toi Toujours

Green Earth (24 September 2008)
 1. Green Earth
 2. Life
 3. Sea Green
 4. Desert Moon
 5. Sad Forest
 6. For Maori
 7. Ripples
 8. Ondines
 9. Border
 10. Sakura Kaoru
 11. The end of the Journey

Spiritual Discovery (21 October 2009)
 1. Original Scenery
 2. Glowing Horizon
 3. Fluttering
 4. Journey to the next World
 5. Rising Sun
 6. Live in Quiet
 7. Japonisme
 8. Peace of Mind
 9. Purplish Tone
 10. Beauty in the Seasons
 11. Journey of the Soul
 12. Original Scenery

Missa Johnouchi (Best Album) (6 October 2010)
Disc 1
Ano Koro [That Time]
Kimagure Hakusho
Dakishimete Once Again [To Hug You Once Again]
Maioriru Tenshi [Flying Down Angel]
Cafe CLASSIQUE
Aru Hareta Nichi ni [In a Fine Day]
Hikari Afure te ~requiem~
Harukanaru Kisetsu ni [In Distant Season]
Ieji [The Way Home]
Ai no Chikara [The Power of Love]
Ken [The Keys]
Le Courage
Kimi no Koe ga Kikitai [Want to Hear Your Voice]
Kimi wo Matsu Seishun [The Youth to Wait for You]
Toki no Kawa [The River of Time]
Il Pleure dans mon ceur
Watashi no Sonzai no Imi [The Meaning of My Being]
Avec Toi Toujours
Disc 2
Asian Wind
Marco Polo
In Paradisum (Single Version)
Kataribe (Piano & String Version)
Shangri-la
Prayer
Kuge II
Evening
souvenir d'amour
Lux ~Sukui~ [salvation]
Pure
Le Chant de La Terre
Illumine
Sakura Kaoru [The Fragrance of Cherry Blossoms]
Original Scenery

Will Light (2013)
 1. Will Light
 2. Lesson in the Life
 3. Timeless Wind
 4. Deja vu
 5. Friendship
 6. Passed the Film
 7. Eternal Time
 8. Farewell Rain
 9. Il pleure dans mon coer
 10. Requiem
 11. Miracle of Morning

Single

Il pleure dans mon cœur 
 1. Il pleure dans mon cœur
 2. Pure
 3. Seinaru Toki 2 [Holy Moment 2]

Avec Toi Toujours 
 1. Avec Toi Toujours
 2. Avec Toi Toujours (Instrumental)
 3. Kono Te wo Kazashite [Put Up Your Hands]
 4. Kono Te wo Kazashite (Instrumental)

Watashi no Sonzai no Imi 
 1. The Meaning of My Being [Watashi no Sonzai no Imi]
 2. The Meaning of My Being (La La La Version)
 3. The Meaning of My Being (Instrumental)
 4. Indigo Sunset [Aiiro no Yuuhi]

Link 
 Missa Johnouchi Official Website
 Pacific Moon
 NPO WORLD HERITAGE TORCH-RUN CONCERT

1960 births
20th-century conductors (music)
20th-century Japanese pianists
20th-century women composers
21st-century conductors (music)
21st-century Japanese pianists
21st-century women composers
Japanese composers
Japanese conductors (music)
Japanese women composers
Japanese women singers
Japanese pianists
Japanese women pianists
Living people
New-age composers
New-age musicians
New-age pianists
Women conductors (music)
21st-century Japanese women musicians
20th-century women pianists
21st-century women pianists